Pizzo Magn or Monte Crenone is a mountain of the Swiss Lepontine Alps, overlooking Biasca in the canton of Ticino. It is located west of the Mottone di Cava.

References

External links
 Pizzo Magn on Hikr

Mountains of the Alps
Mountains of Switzerland
Mountains of Ticino
Lepontine Alps